William Brent Bell is an American film director, screenwriter, and producer. He is known for his work on horror films such as Stay Alive (2006), The Devil Inside (2012), Wer (2013), The Boy (2016), Brahms: The Boy II (2020), Separation (2021), Orphan: First Kill (2022), and Lord of Misrule (2023). His films have grossed over $300 million worldwide at the box office.

Life and career
Bell was born in Lexington, Kentucky. Along with writing partner Matthew Peterman, Bell wrote the screenplay Mercury, which was bought by Universal Studios with Gale Anne Hurd producing. Bell and Peterman went on to set up several studio projects. Some include Ignition, an action-drama set up at Warner Bros. with Kurt Russell and Goldie Hawn producing and Illusion, a thriller set up at Walt Disney Pictures. On the television side the duo created several one-hour TV series including Eye to Eye with Warner Bros. Television and McG, Worthy and McGraw with ABC Television and Tim Minear as well as The Fix with Sarah Timberman and Sony Television.  Bell and Peterman have also developed a number of videogames including Master Thief, with John Woo.

Bell's first horror project was as co-writer and director of the horror thriller, Stay Alive, which was produced with McG and Peter Schlessel and financed by Spyglass Entertainment and Endgame Entertainment.  Stay Alive was distributed domestically by Buena Vista Pictures and internationally by Universal Pictures. His second horror film was The Devil Inside, written with Matt Peterman. Produced by Peterman and Morris Paulson, the film stars Fernanda Andrade, Simon Quarterman, Evan Helmuth, and Suzan Crowley, and was released theatrically on January 6 by Paramount Pictures. The film topped the US box office on its opening weekend, becoming a record-breaking commercial success and grossing over $100 million.

In 2013, Bell went into production on his third horror film, Wer which was released by Focus Features. Nav Qateel of Influx Magazine called Wer, "the best Werewolf film I've seen in years, or perhaps, ever." Epic Horror Review wrote, "Wer not only redefines the werewolf movie but also saves it." Wer would go on to be described by horrornews.net as, "One of the best films I've seen so far this year and a must to watch." and "a film that you want to not only watch but add to your collection" by wickedchannel.com 

In 2014, Bell sold his pilot Posthuman to USA Network and UCP with Jason Blum producing. In 2015, Bell set up a series at Fox entitled Haunted with Chris Morgan of the Fast & Furious franchise. This 20th Century Fox Television production is loosely based on the true story chronicled in the book The Demon of Brownsville Road: A Pittsburgh Family's Battle with Evil.

In 2015, Bell would direct the supernatural thriller The Boy, which Tom Rosenberg and Gary Lucchesi produced through Lakeshore Entertainment, along with Matt Berenson, Jim Wedaa, and Roy Lee. The script was written by Stacey Menear and starred Lauren Cohan, Jim Norton, Diana Hardcastle, Ben Robson, Rupert Evans, and James Russell. STX Entertainment released The Boy on January 22, 2016 and it went on to gross a worldwide total of $77 million, against a budget of under $8 million. Chris Alexander of ShockTilYouDrop called it "one of the best contemporary wide release horror movies I've seen in years." Joe Leydon criticized the story line as average in Variety and commented, "Despite game efforts by the cast, this tepid horror opus is never scary enough to overcome its silly premise." In 2017, GQ Magazine called the film, "the most underrated horror movie of 2016."

In 2019 Bell directed the sequel Brahms: The Boy II, a supernatural horror film starring Katie Holmes, Ralph Ineson, Christopher Convery and Owain Yeoman. The stand-alone sequel to the 2016 film The Boy was written by Stacey Menear and released on February 21, 2020. Later that year, Bell directed and produced Separation, an American horror film, from a screenplay by Nick Amadeus and Josh Braun. It stars Rupert Friend, Violet McGraw, Mamie Gummer, Madeline Brewer and Brian Cox. In March 2021, Open Road Films and Briarcliff Entertainment acquired distribution rights to the film, and released it on April 30, 2021.

In 2021, Bell directed Orphan: First Kill, an American horror film from a screenplay by David Coggeshall. It is a prequel to the 2009 film Orphan. David Leslie Johnson-McGoldrick serves as executive producer. Isabelle Fuhrman reprises her role as Esther, with Julia Stiles also starring. In September 2021, Paramount Pictures acquired U.S. distribution rights to the film, Orphan: First Kill was released in the United States on August 19, by Paramount Players in select theatres, digital, and streaming via Paramount+. , Orphan: First Kill has grossed $5.4 million in the United States and Canada, and $39.1 million in other territories, for a worldwide total of $44.5 million. On review aggregator Rotten Tomatoes, the film holds an approval rating of 72% based on 137 reviews

Bell is currently in post production on Lord of Misrule, an upcoming folk horror film starring Tuppence Middleton, Ralph Ineson, and Matt Stokoe.

Filmography

References

External links

American television producers
American television writers
American male screenwriters
Living people
American male television writers
Writers from Lexington, Kentucky
Film directors from Kentucky
Screenwriters from Kentucky
Film producers from Kentucky
Horror film directors
Year of birth missing (living people)